The University of Maryland Medical System (also known as UMMS) is a private, not-for-profit corporation founded in 1984 and based in Baltimore, Maryland. It owns and operates 13 hospitals (as of 2018) in Maryland, and has more than 2,500 licensed beds, 122,300 annual admissions and gross patient revenues of $4.4 billion annually. UMMS physicians and care teams work with University of Maryland School of Medicine specialists to provide primary and specialty care at more than 150 locations across the state, including a network of academic, community and specialty hospitals.

UMMS Hospitals

University of Maryland Medical Center 

One of the nation's oldest teaching hospitals, this 806-bed facility — located in downtown Baltimore — is home to the University of Maryland Marlene and Stewart Greenebaum Cancer Center, the R Adams Cowley Shock Trauma Center and the University of Maryland Children's Hospital. The medical staff comprises nearly 1,200 attending physicians who are faculty members at the University of Maryland School of Medicine, as well as 900 residents and fellows in all medical specialties. University of Maryland Medical Center is ranked No. 10 in caring for patients with ear, nose and throat (ENT) conditions and No. 16 in cancer care, according to the 2019-20 U.S. News & World Report's Best Hospitals specialty rankings.

University of Maryland Medical Center Midtown Campus 

This 100- bed teaching hospital offers health care for more than 110,000 people annually. The hospital has been affiliated with the University of Maryland Medical System since 1999, and has over 1,400 employees and 500 doctors, covering 30 different specialties. UMMC Midtown Campus (formerly Maryland General Hospital), has been providing community health care in West Baltimore and Midtown for more than a century.

University of Maryland Baltimore Washington Medical Center 

This 285-bed community hospital located between Baltimore and Annapolis, offers a wide variety of services, including cancer care, cardiology, neurosurgery, orthopedics, women's health, diabetes and endocrinology and emergency medicine. University of Maryland Baltimore Washington Medical Center (formally North Arundel) has more than 2,800 employees and 800 doctors serving the residents of Anne Arundel County. UM BWMC was recognized by U.S. News & World Report in its listing of 2018-19 Best Hospitals and was rated as “High Performing” in four adult procedures and conditions.

University of Maryland Capital Region Health 
The University of Maryland Capital Region Health is a not-for-profit healthcare system serving the citizens of Prince George's County and the surrounding area. It comprises a hospital, two freestanding emergency centers, a surgery center, an employed-physician medical group, and a network of outpatient facilities. The facility serving this system is the University of Maryland Capital Region Medical Center.

University of Maryland Capital Region Health is the largest private employer by number of employees in Prince George's County.

University of Maryland Charles Regional Medical Center 

University of Maryland Charles Regional Medical Center is a 99-bed medical center, with 423 medical staff. In 2017, UM CRMC opened the new Medical Pavilion in North La Plata, offering sports and orthopedic rehabilitation, an imaging center and primary care services. 

In July 2011, Civista Medical Center announced its affiliation as a member hospital of the University of Maryland Medical System (UMMS). On July 1, 2013, the Civista Medical Center began operating under the name University of Maryland Charles Regional Medical Center in the University of Maryland Medical System, becoming the first expansion of UMMS in the Washington, DC metropolitan area.

University of Maryland Laurel Medical Center 

Formerly a community hospital, this facility is currently an Emergency Department and outpatient clinical and surgical center. Construction of a new  medical center on the campus was approved in 2018, with construction to begin in 2019.

University of Maryland Rehabilitation & Orthopedic Institute 

This 137-bed facility, located in Woodlawn, Maryland, is an inpatient rehabilitation and orthopedic hospital  serving both adults and children. Offering specialized rehabilitative care, University of Maryland Rehabilitation & Orthopedic Institute has units treating traumatic brain injury, spinal cord injury, stroke, and orthopedic conditions. Nearly 100 physical, occupational, speech and recreational therapists work with patients during their stay and in follow-up outpatient visits. It also houses the University of Maryland Complementary Medicine Program and the University of Maryland Pain Management Center.

University of Maryland Shore Regional Health 
University of Maryland Shore Regional Health is a regional, nonprofit, medical delivery care network formed on July 1, 2013, through the consolidation of two University of Maryland Medical System partner entities, the former Shore Health and the former Chester River Health. The UM Shore Regional Health network serves the Mid-Shore region, which includes Caroline, Dorchester, Kent, Queen Anne's and Talbot counties. UM Shore Regional Health operates two hospitals, two freestanding emergency centers, a nursing and rehabilitation center, outpatient care centers and home care services throughout the region. UM Shore Regional Health is a partner of ChoiceOne Urgent Care, to provide urgent care services in Denton and Easton. UM Shore Regional Health's key services include stroke care, breast cancer screening and treatment, and cardiovascular and pulmonary rehab.

University of Maryland St. Joseph Medical Center 

University of Maryland St. Joseph Medical Center is a 219-bed hospital (formerly owned by Catholic Health Initiatives) acquired by University of Maryland Medical System in 2012. Located in Baltimore County, University of Maryland St. Joseph Medical Center was founded in 1864 by the Sisters of St. Francis of Philadelphia. UM St. Joseph Medical Center specializes in cancer care, cardiology, orthopedics, women's health, children's services and emergency medicine.

University of Maryland Upper Chesapeake Health 
This not-for-profit, community-based, two-hospital system consists of UM Upper Chesapeake Medical Center in Bel Air and UM Harford Memorial Hospital in Havre de Grace. The 243-bed system delivers a broad range of health care services, technology and facilities. With 2,700 team members and over 550 Medical Staff Physicians serving residents of Harford County, eastern Baltimore County, and western Cecil County, UM UCH is the second largest private employer in Harford County, Maryland.

Mt. Washington Pediatric Hospital 

This 102-bed pediatric and rehabilitation hospital, located in northwest Baltimore, provides specialty medical care to infants, children, and adolescents aged 0–21 with complex medical needs.

References

External links 
 

University System of Maryland
Hospital networks in the United States
Medical and health organizations based in Maryland
Hospitals established in 1984
1984 establishments in Maryland